Colonel Abrams (May 25, 1949 – November 24, 2016) was an American musician, singer, songwriter, dancer and actor.

Early life
Colonel Abrams (his real name) was born in Detroit, Michigan. His family later moved to East 13 Street, in Manhattan's East Village.

Career
From an early age, Abrams began playing the guitar and piano. He was in several early bands; among them Heavy Impact – in which he played both guitar and keyboards alongside Joe Wells (guitar), Lemar Washington (guitar), Marston "Buffy" Freeman (bass guitar), Ronald Simmons (drums), Harry Jones (trumpet), Tony Moliere (trumpet) and Barbara Mills (saxophone). In 1976, he formed Conservative Manor, 94 East (the band featuring Prince on lead guitar).

He became popular on the New York underground scene via radio and club play, and had his first major hit in 1984 with "Music Is the Answer", on the independent label Streetwise. Other hits in the mid-1980s included "Leave the Message Behind the Door", "Trapped" (a top ten hit in Germany, Ireland, the Netherlands, and the UK), "The Truth", "Speculation", "I'm Not Gonna Let You", and "Over and Over", establishing Abrams as a solo artist, initially in Europe and later in the US.

In 1985, he signed to Steven Machat's label and production company, AMI. Machat, who was collaborating and working with a British producer, Richard James Burgess, hired Burgess to produce Abrams' self-titled debut album. Machat then arranged for MCA Records to sign Abrams for worldwide releases. Burgess produced the songs "Trapped", "I'm Not Gonna Let You", and "Table for Two".

"Trapped" reached the top five in the UK Singles Chart and topped the US Hot Dance Music/Club Play chart in 1985, followed by his self-titled album, which spent two weeks at number one the following year. An electronic remix of "Trapped" was later released in 1995 by Boards of Canada, under the pseudonym Hell Interface. A new version of "Trapped" ("Trapped 2006") was released in the UK.

"I'm Not Gonna Let" also spent a week at number one in the dance chart, in 1986. The album peaked at number 75 on the US Billboard Top 200 and Number 13 on the US Top R&B/Hip-Hop Albums chart. Although Abrams had no American pop hits during his career, he had a number of entries on the US Hot Dance Club Play chart in the 1980s and 1990s, including four entries that hit number one. In 1987, he had his fourth number-one US dance hit with "How Soon We Forget", the same year that he released his second album, You and Me Equals Us.

On January 9, 2007, Abrams released the single "Just When You Thought", the third single on his own record label, Colonel Records, after "Heartbreaker" and "Let Us All Be Friends". Also in 2007, Abrams released "Never Be", "Just Like Mathematics", and "True Stories". In June 2008, his single, "Only a Few", was issued.

Later life and illness
A crowdfunding campaign was launched in 2015, via GoFundMe, in order to help Abrams, as he was homeless, suffering from diabetes, and in poor health. Marshall Jefferson, who had begun his own effort to crowdfund an album, encouraged others to donate to Abrams instead, stating:

As most of you may or may not know, a lot of recording artists don’t have medical coverage or benefits ... Those of us who have listened to his awesome music and know of his plight, have banded together to try to help him through this rough patch.

Death
Abrams died on Thanksgiving Day, November 24, 2016. Numerous music industry luminaries paid tribute, including Tony Tune Herbert, Joey Negro, Dave Pearce, and Swizz Beatz. Jellybean Benitez, a producer who worked on Madonna's "Holiday" and Whitney Houston's "Love Will Save the Day", wrote: "It's a sad day for the House Music community". Jefferson wrote, "Just learned Colonel Abrams passed away," and added, "Never to be forgotten, R.I.P."

Discography

Studio albums

Compilation albums
Best of Colonel Abrams (1999, Universal Special Products)
Strapped: The Best of the Remixes  (2010, Famous)

Singles

 "The Truth" charted on the Hot Dance/Disco chart along with all tracks from the album Colonel Abrams.

See also
List of artists who reached number one on the US Dance chart
List of Number 1 Dance Hits (United States)

References

External links

1949 births
2016 deaths
MCA Records artists
20th-century African-American male singers
African-American male songwriters
American boogie musicians
American garage house musicians
American contemporary R&B singers
American soul singers
Songwriters from Michigan
Singers from Detroit
Homeless people
Scotti Brothers Records artists
21st-century African-American male singers